Mike Cruise (Adrian Michael Cruise) is a British astronomer and astrophysicist, and Emeritus Professor of Astrophysics and Space research at the University of Birmingham. He was President of the Royal Astronomical Society from 2018-2020; he had previously been Secretary, Vice-president and Treasurer of the Royal Astronomical Society.

References

21st-century British astronomers
Living people
Alumni of University College London
People associated with Birmingham City University
Year of birth missing (living people)